Joshua Eric Dodge (October 25, 1854May 2, 1921) was an American lawyer politician, and judge from the U.S. state of Wisconsin.  He was a justice of the Wisconsin Supreme Court for 12 years (1898–1910).  Earlier, he served as a United States Assistant Attorney General in the administration of President Grover Cleveland, and was a member of the Wisconsin State Assembly, representing Racine County in the 1891 session.

Biography

Joshua Dodge was in Arlington, Massachusetts, in October 1854.  He was raised and educated there, attending the Westford Academy, in Westford, Massachusetts, and then attending Iowa College, in Grinnell, Iowa.  He graduated in 1875, then went on to study at the Boston University School of Law, graduating in 1877.

He was admitted to the bar in Boston, but moved to Wisconsin the following spring, settling in Racine, Wisconsin, in March 1878.  He practiced law there for over a decade, and was involved in local politics with the Democratic Party.  In 1890, he was elected to the Wisconsin State Assembly, running on the Democratic Party ticket.

Following his term in the Legislature, he was appointed to the national Board of Commissioners for the Promotion of Uniformity of Legislation in the United States.  The following Summer, U.S. President Grover Cleveland appointed him United States Assistant Attorney General.  He was confirmed in the Fall and served through the rest of the Cleveland administration, resigning in 1897 after his successor was confirmed.

In January 1898, he opened a new law office in Milwaukee in partnership with another young Racine lawyer, Samuel Field.  The practice lasted only a short time, however, as Dodge was appointed to the Wisconsin Supreme Court in the Fall of 1898 by Governor Edward Scofield.  Dodge replaced Silas U. Pinney, who was resigning due to poor health.  Dodge was elected to finish Pinney's judicial term in the Spring 1899 election, and was subsequently elected to another ten-year term in April 1901. Dodge did not face an opponent in either election.

Dodge retired in the Fall of 1910, with a year left on his term.  He died at his home in Milwaukee on May 2, 1921, after a long illness.  Dodge never married and had no children.

Electoral history

Wisconsin Assembly (1890)

| colspan="6" style="text-align:center;background-color: #e9e9e9;"| General Election, November 4, 1890

Wisconsin Supreme Court (1899, 1901)

| colspan="6" style="text-align:center;background-color: #e9e9e9;"| General Election, April 4, 1899

| colspan="6" style="text-align:center;background-color: #e9e9e9;"| General Election, April 2, 1901

References

External links
 Justice Joshua E. Dodge at Wisconsin Court System

1854 births
1921 deaths
People from Arlington, Massachusetts
Politicians from Racine, Wisconsin
Grinnell College alumni
Boston University School of Law alumni
Democratic Party members of the Wisconsin State Assembly
United States Assistant Attorneys General
Justices of the Wisconsin Supreme Court